Ralph Joseph Miller (February 29, 1896 in Fort Wayne, Indiana – March 18, 1939 in Fort Wayne, Indiana) was a Major League Baseball player who played infielder from -. He would play for the Philadelphia Phillies and Washington Senators.

In 163 games over 3 seasons, Miller posted a .248 batting average with 48 runs, 3 home runs and 54 RBI. In the 1924 World Series, he hit .182 (2-for-11) with 2 RBI.

External links

1896 births
1939 deaths
Major League Baseball infielders
Baseball players from Fort Wayne, Indiana
Philadelphia Phillies players
Washington Senators (1901–1960) players